Syzeton is a genus of ant-like leaf beetles in the family Aderidae. There are more than 10 described species in Syzeton.

The species of Syzeton were formerly members of the genus Zonantes. In 2022, research was published moving the species to the genus Syzeton.

Species
These 12 species belong to the genus Zonantes:
 Syzeton arizonae Gompel, 2022
 Syzeton ater (LeConte, 1875)
 Syzeton belovi Gompel, 2022
 Syzeton fasciatus (Melsheimer, 1846)
 Syzeton floridanus (Werner, 1990)
 Syzeton gruberi Gompel, 2022
 Syzeton hubbardi (Casey, 1895)
 Syzeton nubifer (LeConte, 1878)
 Syzeton ouachitanus (Werner, 1990)
 Syzeton pallidus (Werner, 1990)
 Syzeton signatus (Haldeman, 1848)
 Syzeton subfasciatus (LeConte, 1875)

References

External links

 

Aderidae
Taxa named by Thomas Lincoln Casey Jr.
Articles created by Qbugbot